Willamette Hall is a building on the University of Oregon campus in Eugene, Oregon. Opened in 1990, it is home to the university's Physics Department. The four-story building contains numerous faculty offices, a 224-seat lecture hall, classrooms, and laboratories. The atrium is named after Paul Olum, former university president and mathematician.

As part of the Lorry I. Lokey Science Complex, it connects directly to Klamath Hall.

Images

See also
 Alan Turing (sculpture) by Wayne Chabre (1988)
 Einstein Gargoyle by Wayne Chabre (1986)
 John von Neumann (sculpture) by Wayne Chabre (1987)
 Maxwell & Demon Gargoyle by Wayne Chabre (1989)
University of Oregon College of Arts and Sciences

References

External links 

UO Department of Physics
UO Libraries' Architecture Guide

1990 establishments in Oregon
University and college academic buildings in the United States
University of Oregon buildings
School buildings completed in 1990